Ennackal Chandy George Sudarshan (also known as E. C. G. Sudarshan; 16 September 1931 – 13 May 2018) was an Indian American theoretical physicist and a professor at the University of Texas. Sudarshan has been credited with numerous contributions to the field of theoretical physics, including Glauber–Sudarshan P representation, V-A theory, tachyons, quantum Zeno effect, open quantum system and Lindblad equation, spin–statistics theorem, non-invariance groups, positive maps of density matrices, and quantum computation.

Early life
Ennackal Chandy George Sudarshan was born in Pallom, Kottayam, Travancore, British India. He was raised in a Syrian Christian family, but later left the religion and converted to Hinduism following his marriage. He married Lalita Rau on December 20, 1954, and they have three sons, Alexander, Arvind (deceased) and Ashok. George and Lalita were divorced in 1990 and he married Bhamathi Gopalakrishnan in Austin, Texas.

He studied at CMS College Kottayam, and graduated with honors from the Madras Christian College in 1951. He obtained his master's degree at the University of Madras in 1952. He moved to Tata Institute of Fundamental Research (TIFR) and worked there for a brief period with Homi Bhabha as well as others. Subsequently, he moved to University of Rochester in New York to work under Robert Marshak as a graduate student. In 1958, he received his Ph.D. degree from the University of Rochester. At this point he moved to Harvard University to join Julian Schwinger as a postdoctoral fellow.

Career
Sudarshan made significant contributions to several areas of physics. He was the originator (with Robert Marshak) of the V-A theory of the weak force (later propagated by Richard Feynman and Murray Gell-Mann), which eventually paved the way for the electroweak theory. Feynman acknowledged Sudarshan's contribution in 1963 stating that the V-A theory was discovered by Sudarshan and Marshak and publicized by Gell-Mann and himself. He also developed a quantum representation of coherent light later known as Glauber–Sudarshan representation (for which controversially Glauber was awarded the 2005 Nobel prize in Physics ignoring Sudarshan's contributions).

Sudarshan's most significant work may have been his contribution to the field of quantum optics. His theorem proves the equivalence of classical wave optics to quantum optics. The theorem makes use of the Sudarshan representation. This representation also predicts optical effects that are purely quantum, and cannot be explained classically. Sudarshan was also the first to propose the existence of tachyons, particles that travel faster than light. He developed a fundamental formalism called dynamical maps to study the theory of open quantum system. He, in collaboration with Baidyanath Misra, also proposed the quantum Zeno effect.

Sudarshan and collaborators initiated the "Quantum theory of charged-particle beam optics", by working out the focusing action of a magnetic quadrupole using the Dirac equation.

He taught at the Tata Institute of Fundamental Research (TIFR), University of Rochester, Syracuse University, and Harvard. From 1969 onwards, he was a professor of physics at the University of Texas at Austin and a senior professor at the Indian Institute of Science. He worked as the director of the Institute of Mathematical Sciences (IMSc), Chennai, India, for five years during the 1980s dividing his time between India and USA. During his tenure, he transformed it into a centre of excellence. He also met and held many discussions with philosopher J. Krishnamurti. He was felicitated on his 80th birthday, at IMSc Chennai on 16 September 2011. His areas of interest included elementary particle physics, quantum optics, quantum information, quantum field theory, gauge field theories, classical mechanics and foundations of physics. He was also deeply interested in Vedanta, on which he lectured frequently.

Controversy regarding Nobel Prize
Sudarshan began working on quantum optics at the University of Rochester in 1960. Two years later, Glauber criticized the use of classical electromagnetic theory in explaining optical fields, which surprised Sudarshan because he believed the theory provided accurate explanations. Sudarshan subsequently wrote a paper expressing his ideas and sent a preprint to Glauber. Glauber informed Sudarshan of similar results and asked to be acknowledged in the latter's paper, while criticizing Sudarshan in his own paper. "Glauber criticized Sudarshan’s representation, but his own was unable to generate any of the typical quantum optics phenomena, hence he introduces what he calls a P-representation, which was Sudarshan’s representation by another name", wrote a physicist. "This representation, which had at first been scorned by Glauber, later becomes known as the Glauber–Sudarshan representation."

Sudarshan was passed over for the Physics Nobel Prize on more than one occasion, leading to controversy in 2005 when several physicists wrote to the Swedish Academy, protesting that Sudarshan should have been awarded a share of the Prize for the Sudarshan diagonal representation (also known as Glauber–Sudarshan representation) in quantum optics, for which Roy J. Glauber won his share of the prize. Sudarshan and other physicists sent a letter to the Nobel Committee claiming that the P representation had more contributions of "Sudarshan" than "Glauber". The letter goes on to say that Glauber criticized Sudarshan's theory—before renaming it the "P representation" and incorporating it into his own work. In an unpublished letter to The New York Times, Sudarshan calls the "Glauber–Sudarshan representation" a misnomer, adding that "literally all subsequent theoretic developments in the field of Quantum Optics make use of" Sudarshan's work— essentially, asserting that he had developed the breakthrough.

In 2007, Sudarshan told the Hindustan Times, "The 2005 Nobel prize for Physics was awarded for my work, but I wasn't the one to get it. Each one of the discoveries that this Nobel was given for work based on my research." Sudarshan also commented on not being selected for the 1979 Nobel, "Steven Weinberg, Sheldon Glashow and Abdus Salam built on work I had done as a 26-year-old student. If you give a prize for a building, shouldn’t the fellow who built the first floor be given the prize before those who built the second floor?"

Awards

 Honorary doctorate by University of Kerala
 Kerala Sastra Puraskaram for lifetime accomplishments in science, 2013
 Dirac Medal of the ICTP, 2010
 Padma Vibhushan, second highest civilian award from the Government of India, 2007
 Majorana Prize, 2006
 First Prize in Physics, 1985
 TWAS Prize, 1985
 Bose Medal, 1977
 Padma Bhushan, third highest civilian award from the Government of India, 1976
 C V Raman Award, 1970

Books
 1961: (with Robert Marshak) Introduction to Elementary Particle Physics, Interscience Publishers, Google Books snippet view
 1968: (with John R. Klauder) Fundamentals of Quantum Optics, Dover Books  Google Books preview of 2006 edition
 1974: (with N. Mukunda) Classical Dynamics: a modern perspective, World Scientific  Google Books preview of 2015 edition
 1998: (with Ian Duck) Pauli and the Spin–Statistics Theorem, World Scientific,  Google Books preview
 1999: (with Tony Rothman) Doubt and Certainty: The celebrated academy debates on science, mysticism, and reality, Basic Books 
 2004: (with Giampiero Esposito and Giuseppe Marmo) From Classical to Quantum Mechanics: An Introduction to the Formalism, Foundations and Applications, Cambridge University Press  Google Books preview
 2014: (with Giampiero Esposito, Giuseppe Marmo, and Gennaro Miele) Advanced Concepts in Quantum Mechanics, Cambridge University Press

See also

Winners of Padma Bhushan

References

External links
A LOOK-BACK AT FOUR DECADES OF RESEARCH By ECG SUDARSHAN
Seven Science Quests Symposium, The University of Texas at Austin, 2006
Home page with vita and publications
Publications on ArXiv
Collected works
ECG Sudarshan on Keral.com
Sudarshan's letter to Nobel Committee
Lecture- Perspectives And Perceptions: Causality And Unpredictability

1931 births
2018 deaths
Harvard University faculty
Academic staff of the Indian Institute of Science
Indian expatriates in the United States
20th-century Indian physicists
Scientists from Kerala
Madras Christian College alumni
Indian particle physicists
Pantheists
People from Kottayam district
Recipients of the Padma Bhushan in literature & education
Recipients of the Padma Vibhushan in science & engineering
Syracuse University faculty
University of Rochester alumni
Vedanta
University of Madras alumni
Fellows of the Indian National Science Academy
Indian theoretical physicists
TWAS laureates
Indian optical physicists
Indian institute directors
21st-century Indian physicists
CMS College Kottayam alumni
Converts to Hinduism from Christianity
Indian former Christians
Fellows of the American Physical Society